Yazab (also Romanized as Yazāb and Yaz Āb; also known as Ḩamīd) is a village in Shoaybiyeh-ye Gharbi Rural District, Shadravan District, Shushtar County, Khuzestan Province, Iran. At the 2006 census, its population was 334, in 49 families.

References 

Populated places in Shushtar County